RHD may refer to:

 RHD (gene), a gene which determines RhD positive or negative
 RhD haemolytic disease of the newborn
 Rh(D), an antigen within the rhesus blood group system
 FAP 403 RHD, a coach bus model manufactured by Fabrika automobila Priboj
 Rabbit haemorrhagic disease, a disease caused by the rabbit haemorrhagic disease virus
 Red Hand Defenders, an illegal paramilitary organisation in Northern Ireland
 Rheumatic heart disease, a possible result of rheumatic fever
 Right hemisphere brain damage
 Right-hand drive, where a car's steering wheel is mounted on the right side, see Left- and right-hand traffic
 Robbery Homicide Division, an American TV series
 Random House Dictionary of the English language
 Roads and Highways Department, a government organization of Bangladesh